Not the Tremblin' Kind is the debut studio album by the American singer-songwriter Laura Cantrell. It was released in 2000 on Diesel Only Records. The album bears a dedication to "the original Beverly Hillbilly", Zeke Manners.

Critical reception
Pitchfork wrote: "Although not a flawless album, Not the Tremblin' Kind can still measure up pretty well to most of the revered alt-country releases of the last decade: albums such as Freakwater's Old Paint, the Blood Oranges' Corn River, and Victoria Williams' Loose." The Record praised Cantrell's "winning urban honky-tonk-angel sensibility."

Shortly after its release, John Peel named the album as possibly one of the favorites of his life.

Track listing
"Not the Tremblin' Kind" (George Usher) – 3:37
"Little Bit of You" (Jay Sherman-Godfrey) – 4:19
"Queen of the Coast" (Laura Cantrell) – 4:59
"Pile of Woe" (Joe Flood) – 3:34
"Two Seconds" (Robert McCreedy) – 3:58
"Churches off the Interstate" (Laura Cantrell) – 2:59
"The Whiskey Makes You Sweeter" (Amy Allison) – 5:07
"Do You Ever Think of Me" (Dan Prater) – 2:44
"Big Wheel" (Jay Sherman-Godfrey, Jeremy Tepper) – 2:30
"My Heart Goes Out to You" (Laura Cantrell) – 4:06
"Somewhere, Some Night" (Carl Montgomery) – 3:24
"The Way It Is" (Laura Cantrell) – 3:48

Personnel
Laura Cantrell – lead vocals
Will Rigby – drums, percussion
Jeremy Chatzky – electric bass, acoustic bass
Jon Graboff – mandolin, acoustic guitar, 12-string electric guitar, pedal steel guitar
Robin Goldwasser – harmony vocals, melodica
Mary Lee Kortes – harmony vocals
Jay Sherman-Godfrey – acoustic guitar, electric guitar, organ, harmony vocals

References

2000 debut albums
Laura Cantrell albums
Diesel Only Records albums